James Carroll (29 March 1907 – 30 July 1973) was an Irish politician. Carroll was elected to Dáil Éireann as an Independent Teachta Dála (TD) for the Dublin South-West constituency at the 1957 general election. He had stood at the 1954 general election for the same constituency but was unsuccessful. He was re-elected at the 1961 general election but lost his seat at the 1965 general election. He served as Lord Mayor of Dublin from 1957 to 1958.

References

 

1907 births
1973 deaths
Independent TDs
Members of the 16th Dáil
Members of the 17th Dáil
Lord Mayors of Dublin
Politicians from County Dublin